The Aleutian Ridge is located in the western part of the  Aleutian Arc in the Bering Sea.

Geography
It consists of a chain of volcanic islands located along the crest of a submarine ridge with most of the active Quaternary stratocones or caldera-like volcanoes located on the northern boundaries of the Aleutian Islands.

References

Underwater ridges of the Bering Sea
Aleutian Islands
Volcanoes of the Aleutian Islands
Volcanism of Alaska
Quaternary volcanism
Quaternary Asia
Quaternary North America